French Women (original title: Sous les jupes des filles) is a 2014 French comedy drama film and the directorial debut of Audrey Dana. The film tells the stories of eleven women in Paris and features an ensemble cast including Isabelle Adjani, Alice Belaïdi, Laetitia Casta, Audrey Dana, Julie Ferrier, Audrey Fleurot, Marina Hands, Géraldine Nakache, Vanessa Paradis, Alice Taglioni and Sylvie Testud. The French title directly translated is "Under the Skirts of Girls".

Plot 

Story of 11 middle-aged women of different backgrounds find their lively distaff side within and outside the bonds of marriage, work and family life. The story is told through a prism of infidelity, insecurity, neurosis, boredom, frustration, menopause ...etc.

Cast 
 Isabelle Adjani as Lili 
 Alice Belaïdi as Adeline
 Laetitia Casta as Agathe
 Audrey Dana as Jo
 Julie Ferrier as Fanny
 Audrey Fleurot as Sophie
 Marina Hands as Inès
 Géraldine Nakache as Ysis
 Vanessa Paradis as Rose
 Alice Taglioni as Marie
 Sylvie Testud as Sam
 Laure Calamy as Cathy Bento
 Stanley Weber as James Gordon
 Alex Lutz as Jacques, Inès's husband
 Guillaume Gouix as Ysis's husband

Soundtrack
"The Seasons Lost Their Jazz" - Natalia Doco - 3:13
"The Good the Bad & the Crazy" - Imany - 2:48
"Try Again" (Theme) - Imany - 1:00
"Don't Be So Shy" - Sherika Sherard - 3:17
"Dropped Down" - Emilie Gassin - 3:10
"The Seasons Lost Their Jazz" (Theme) - Imany - 1:42
"Sitting on the Ground" - Axelle Rousseau - 3:16
"Try Again" - Imany, Emilie Gassin, Natalia Doco, Axelle Rousseau & Sherika Sherard - 3:19
"Don't Be so Shy" (Work in Progress) - Imany - 3:02
"The Good the Bad & the Crazy" (Jazz Theme) - Imany - 2:02
"The Seasons Lost Their Jazz" (Choral Version) - Imany, Natalia Doco, Axelle Rousseau & Sherika Sherard - 3:13
"The Good the Bad & the Crazy" (Movie Version) - Imany - 3:52

References

External links 
 

2014 films
2014 comedy-drama films
2010s French-language films
French comedy-drama films
French feminist films
Films shot in Paris
Films set in Paris
Films directed by Audrey Dana
2014 directorial debut films
2010s French films